Varvara Gracheva was the defending champion but chose to compete at Wimbledon instead.

Anhelina Kalinina won the title, defeating Mayar Sherif in the final, 6–2, 6–3.

Seeds

Draw

Finals

Top half

Bottom half

References

Main Draw

Open Montpellier Méditerranée Métropole Hérault - Singles